Air Chief Marshal Sir Denis Graham Smallwood,  (13 August 1918 – 26 July 1997) was a senior Royal Air Force commander.

RAF career
Educated at King Edward VI School in Birmingham, Smallwood joined the Royal Air Force in 1938.

Smallwood took part in the Second World War and in November 1941 he was appointed Officer Commanding of No. 87 Squadron flying Hurricanes. In 1948 he became Officer Commanding No. 33 Squadron and in 1959 he joined the Directing Staff at the Joint Staff Services College before becoming Station Commander at RAF Biggin Hill in 1953. He became Group Captain, Plans for the Air Task Force in 1956 and then Officer Commanding RAF North Coates in 1959 before becoming Commandant of the College of Air Warfare in 1961. In 1963 he was made Assistant Chief of the Air Staff (Operations) and in 1965 he was appointed Air Officer Commanding No. 3 Group. He went on to be Senior Air Staff Officer at Headquarters, Bomber Command in 1967, Senior Air Staff Officer at Headquarters, Strike Command in 1968 and Air Officer Commanding-in-Chief, Near East Air Force (including responsibility for British Forces Cyprus and Administration of the Sovereign Base Areas) in 1969. Finally he was appointed Vice Chief of the Air Staff in 1970, Air Officer Commander-in-Chief Strike Command in 1974 and Commander-in-Chief, UK Air Forces in 1975 before retiring in 1976.

He lived at Princes Risborough in Buckinghamshire.

Family
In 1940 he married Frances Jeanne Needham ; they had one son and one daughter.

References

External links
Photo of Smallwood in 87 Squadron Hawker Hurricane

|-

|-

1918 births
1997 deaths
Royal Air Force air marshals
British World War II pilots
Knights Grand Cross of the Order of the British Empire
Knights Commander of the Order of the Bath
Companions of the Distinguished Service Order
Recipients of the Distinguished Flying Cross (United Kingdom)
Fellows of the Royal Aeronautical Society